Gailīši Parish is an administrative unit of Bauska Municipality in the Semigallia region of Latvia.

Towns, villages and settlements of Gailīši parish

References 

Parishes of Latvia
Bauska Municipality
Semigallia